Hay Island is a small peninsula located off the Darien, Connecticut, shore of Long Island Sound. Its north shore is located on Ziegler's Cove.  A small road connects the island with Long Neck Point Road.  There are two structures on Hay Island.  One was the home of the late William Ziegler III, a founder of the Maritime Aquarium at Norwalk.

Further reading
Robert C. Duncan, W. Wallace Fenn, and Paul W Fenn, "Hay Island, Noroton, Connecticut," The Cruising Guide to the New England Coast: Including the Hudson River, Long Island Sound, and the Coast of New Brunswick (W. W. Norton & Company, 2002), 113-114, for information on the water near Hay Island

References

Long Island Sound
Darien, Connecticut
Peninsulas of Connecticut
Landforms of Fairfield County, Connecticut